Wilno Land was a district of Poland, with capital in Vilnius, that existed from 13 April 1922 until 20 January 1926. The territory was formed in 1922 from territories of the Republic of Central Lithuania incorporated into Poland, and a 3 counties from Nowogródek Voivodeship. In 1926, the territory was transformed into the Wilno Voivodeship, becoming the last voivodeship of the Second Polish Republic to be formed.

History 

Wilno Land was formed on 13 April 1922, from territories of Republic of Central Lithuania, following its incorporation by Second Polish Republic. The annexation itself was decided in the bill signed on 6 April 1922. The annexed lands included the city of Vilnius as well as the territories of Brasław, Oszmiana, Święciany, Troki and Wilno Counties. Additionally to territory were added Duniłowicze, Dzisna and Wilejka Counties from neighbouring Nowogródek Voivodeship. Between 1923 and 1924, Wilno and Troki Counties were combined into Wilno-Troki County, tough de facto they acted as singular county since 1921. On 1 January 1926, Duniłowicze County was transformed into Postawy County.

On 20 January 1926, following the bill from 22 December 1925, Wilno Land was transformed into the Wilno Voivodeship, becoming the last voivodeship of the Second Polish Republic to be formed.

Administrative division 
Wilno Land was divided into 8 counties that were divided into the 118 municipilaties, 13 of which were cities.

Counties 
Vilnius (city county)
Brasław County
Duniłowicze County (1922–1925)
Dzisna County 
Oszmiana County
Postawy County (1926)
Święciany County
Troki County (de jure 1922–1922/23, de facto 1921)
Wilejka County
Wilno County (de jure 1921–1923/24, de facto 1921)
Wilno-Troki County (de jure 1923/24–1926, de facto 1921–1926)

Notes

References

Bibliography 
 Zeszyt VII. Spis ludności na terenach administrowanych przez Zarząd Cywilny Ziem Wschodnich (grudzień 1919). Lviv/Warsaw. Książnica Polska T-wa Naucz. Szkół Wyższych. 1920, p. 50, series: Prace geograficzne wydawane by Eugenjusz Romer.
 Zarząd Cywilny Ziem Wschodnich (19 lutego 1919 – 9 września 1920) by Joanna Gierowska-Kałłaur, 1st edition. Warsaw. Wydawnictwo Neriton. Instytut Historii PAN. 2003. p. 447. ISBN 83-88973-60-6.

States and territories established in 1922
States and territories disestablished in 1926
1922 establishments in Poland
1926 disestablishments in Poland
Districts of the Second Polish Republic
Wilno Voivodeship (1926–1939)
Western Belorussia (1918–1939)
History of Vilnius